Šiupyliai is a small village in Šiauliai district, Lithuania, with a population of 324 according to the 2011 census. It has a wooden church, built in 1924 and named after Saint Aloysius Gonzaga. According to folk etymology, village's name is derived from supiltas (from "pour") in reference to a nearby hill fort.

References

Villages in Šiauliai County